The 2018–19 season is the 116th in the history of the Southern League since its establishment in 1894. The league (known as Evo-Stik League Southern, following a sponsorship deal with Evo-Stik) has two Premier divisions (Central and South) at step 3 of the National League System (NLS) and two Division One divisions (Central and South) at step 4 of the NLS.

This is the first season to consist of four divisions in the league, following a shakeup of the Southern, Isthmian, and Northern Premier Leagues divisions by geographical region. The Southern League was chosen to create a new division at Step 3; the 21 clubs remaining from the Premier Division the previous season were split into two new Premier divisions; Central and South. The league constitution was announced in May 2018.

Premier Division Central

At the end of the previous season a new division was created at step 3, while the number of clubs in step 3 divisions was reduced from 24 to 22. The Premier Division Central consisted of ten clubs from the previous season Premier Division, and twelve new clubs.

Promoted from Division One East:
AFC Rushden & Diamonds

Promoted from the Northern Premier League Division One South:
Alvechurch
Bedworth United

Relegated from the National League North:
Tamworth

Transferred from the Isthmian League Premier Division:
Leiston
Lowestoft Town
Needham Market

Transferred from the Northern Premier League Premier Division:
Barwell
Coalville Town
Halesowen Town
Rushall Olympic
Stourbridge

League table

Play-offs

Semi-finals

Final

Super final

Results table

Stadia and locations

Premier Division South

At the end of the previous season a new division was created at step 3, while the number of clubs in step 3 divisions was reduced from 24 to 22. The Premier Division South consisted of ten clubs from the previous season Premier Division, and twelve new clubs.

Promoted from Division One East:
Beaconsfield Town
Hartley Wintney

Promoted from Division One West:
Taunton Town
Salisbury
Swindon Supermarine
Wimborne Town

Promoted from the Isthmian League South Division:
Walton Casuals

Relegated from the National League South:
Poole Town

Transferred from the Isthmian League Premier Division:
Harrow Borough
Hendon
Metropolitan Police
Staines Town

League table

Play-offs

Semi-finals

Final

Super final

Results table

Stadia and locations

Division One Central

A new division was added at step 4 within the Isthmian League, while the number of clubs in every step 4 division was decreased to 20. Division One Central featured eight clubs from the previous season Division One West and twelve new clubs.

Promoted from the Midland League:
Bromsgrove Sporting
Coleshill Town

Promoted from the Spartan South Midlands League:
Welwyn Garden City
Berkhamsted

Promoted from the United Counties League:
Yaxley

Relegated from the Premier Division:
Dunstable Town

Relegated from the Northern Premier League Premier Division:
Sutton Coldfield Town

Transferred from Division One West:
Didcot Town
Kidlington
North Leigh

Transferred from the Northern Premier League Division One South:
Corby Town
Peterborough Sports

League table

Play-offs

Semi-finals

Final

Results table

Stadia and locations

Division One South

A new division was added at step 4 within the Isthmian League, while the number of clubs in every step 4 division was decreased to 20. Division One South featured 13 clubs from the previous season Division One East and seven new clubs.

Promoted from the Hellenic League:
Thatcham Town
Highworth Town

Promoted from the Wessex League:
Blackfield & Langley

Promoted from the Western League:
Street
Melksham Town

Transferred from Division One East:
Fleet Town
Moneyfields

League table

Play-offs

Semi-finals

Final

Results table

Stadia and locations

Step 4 play-off winners rating

League Cup

The 2018–19 Southern League Cup was the 81st edition of the Southern League Cup, the cup competition of the Southern Football League.

Calendar

Preliminary round

First round

Second round

Third round

Quarter-finals

Semi-finals

Final

See also
 Southern Football League
 2018–19 Isthmian League
 2018–19 Northern Premier League

References

External links
Official website

Southern Football League seasons
7